Ayers may refer to:


People
A.D. Ayers, American baseball umpire (National League)
Aaron Ayers (1836–1900), New Zealand auctioneer and politician
Bill Ayers (born 1944), American academic and activist
Bill Ayers (baseball) (1919–1980), American Major League Baseball pitcher
Bruce Ayers (born 1962), American small business owner and politician
Cameron Ayers (born 1991), American basketball player
Charlie Ayers (born 1966), former executive chef for Google
David Ayers (1841–1916), Union Army soldier during the American Civil War
Demarcus Ayers (born 1994), American football player
Dick Ayers (1924–2014), American comic book artist
Duffy Ayers (1915–2017), English portrait painter
Edward L. Ayers (born 1953), American historian, president of the University of Richmond
Eli Ayers (1778–1822), first colonial agent of the American Colonization Society
Fred Ayers (1912–1986), Australian rules footballer
Frederick Ayers, English engineer
Greg Ayers, Australian atmospheric scientist
Haskel Ayers (1936–2020), American auctioneer and politician
Henry Ayers (1821–1897), former Premier of South Australia
Howard "Doc" Ayers (1922–2020), American football coach
James F. Ayers (1847–1895), American soldier
Janeé Ayers (born 1981), American politician
Jason Ayers (born 1982), American professional wrestling referee
Jeremy Ayers (1948–2016), American artist, writer, musician, and photographer
John Ayers (1953–1995), National Football League offensive lineman
John Ayers Merritt, (1926–1983), American football coach
John G. K. Ayers (1837–1913), Union Army soldier during the American Civil War
John W. Ayers, American behavioral epidemiologist
Kevin Ayers (1944–2013), British rock singer
Maurice L. Ayers (1819–1884), American banker, farmer, hotelier, politician
Michael Ayers (boxer) (born 1965), British boxer
Michael R. Ayers (born 1935), British philosopher
Mike Ayers (born 1948), American football coach
Nabil Ayers, American entrepreneur and musician
Nathaniel Ayers (born 1951), American musician
Nick Ayers (born 1982), American political strategist
Nigel Ayers (born 1957), English multimedia artist
Paul Ayers (born 1961), Archdeacon of Leeds
Paul Ayers Robert Foster-Bell (born 1977), New Zealand diplomat, politician
Paul L. Ayers, Major General in the Rhode Island Air National Guard
Phoebe Ayers, American librarian
Randy Ayers (born 1956), American basketball coach
Robert Ayers (born 1985), American football defensive end
Ron Ayers (born 1932), British aeronautical engineer and designer of ThrustSSC
Rowan Ayers (1922–2008), television producer and poet
Roy Ayers (born 1940), American vibraphone player
Roy E. Ayers (1882–1955), American politician
Rufus A. Ayers (1849–1926), Virginia lawyer, businessman, and politician
Sam Ayers, American actor
Scott Ayers, American musician
Stephen T. Ayers, American architect
Thomas G. Ayers (1919–2007), Chicago businessman, philanthropist
Tim Ayers (born 1958), Ohio politician
Tony Ayers (1933–2016), former senior Australian public servant

Places
Ayers, Bond County, Illinois
Ayers, Carroll County, Illinois
Ayers Creek, Antigua
Ayers Creek Falls, Oregon
Ayers House (Adelaide)
Ayers Island (Maine)
Ayers Island Reservoir, New Hampshire
Ayers Kaserne, US army barracks in Germany
Ayers Shop, Mississippi
Ayers Township, Champaign County, Illinois
Ayers, West Virginia
Uluru, formerly known as Ayers Rock, a rock formation in central Australia

Companies
N.W. Ayers, American advertising agency
Ayers Music Publishing Company, a fictional company in Ayn Rand's novel Atlas Shrugged
Ayers Saint Gross, American architectural firm

See also
Ayres (disambiguation)
Ayers Rock (disambiguation)

Surnames of Scottish origin